The following highways are numbered 12E:

United States
 Nebraska Spur 12E
 New York State Route 12E
 Secondary State Highway 12E (Washington) (former)

See also
List of highways numbered 12